Michael Burns MBE (17 January 1937 – 27 February 2021) was a British-born Irish journalist who spent the majority of his career working with national broadcaster RTÉ. He has been described as "one of the most significant journalists in the history of Irish broadcasting."

Career

Burns began his journalism career with the Sunday Independent, before joining RTÉ a year after the television service began. He began writing for the RTÉ Guide, but soon moved to the newsroom. Burns became RTÉ’s first Editor of News Features, launching the News at 1.30, World Report and This Week. By the time of his retirement he had moved to London and was working as RTÉ's London Editor. In 2004 Burns received an MBE in acknowledgment of his services to UK-Irish relations throughout his career.

References

1937 births
2021 deaths
English emigrants to Ireland
Irish radio presenters
Irish reporters and correspondents
RTÉ newsreaders and journalists
Members of the Order of the British Empire